The Grand Gulf Mound (22CB522) is an Early Marksville culture archaeological site located near Port Gibson in Claiborne County, Mississippi, on a bluff  east of  the Mississippi River,  north of the mouth of the Big Black River. The site has an extant burial mound, and may have possibly had two others in the past. The site is believed to have been occupied from 50 to 200 CE. Copper objects, Marksville culture ceramics and a stone platform pipe were found in excavations at the site. The site is believed to be the only site in the Natchez Bluffs region to have been actively involved in the Hopewell Interaction Sphere. It is one of four mounds in the area believed to date to the Early Marksville period, the other three being the Marskville Mound 4 and Crooks Mounds A and B, all located in nearby Louisiana. The mound itself was built in several stages over many years, very similar to the Crooks Mound A in La Salle Parish, Louisiana. Unlike some other Hopewell sites, such as the Tremper Mound in Scioto County, Ohio, the site showed no evidence of a mortuary or communal structure previous to the construction of the mound.

See also
 Grand Gulf Military State Park (Mississippi)
 List of Hopewell sites

References

Marksville culture
Mounds in Mississippi